Emirates Islamic (Formerly known as Emirates Islamic Bank) is one of the four Islamic banks in Dubai, United Arab Emirates. The bank was established in 2004 to deliver banking services in line with Shari'a principles. It offers products designed for individuals and small businesses as well as large corporations.

Emirates Islamic has won many awards and prizes for its services and products. It was recently named the "Best Islamic Bank in the UAE" by two prestigious organizations, World Finance Magazine and Global Banking and Finance Review.

References

External links

 

Banks of the United Arab Emirates
Islamic banking
Banks established in 2004
Companies based in Dubai
Emirati companies established in 2004